, better known mononymously as , is a Japanese actress, singer and fashion model.

Early life and education
Sumire was born in Japan to entertainers Junichi Ishida and Chiaki Matsubara (1958–2022). Sumire's half-brother is actor Issei Ishida. By the time Sumire was seven years old, her parents had divorced, and she moved from Japan to Hawaii with her mother.

Sumire recalled that her mother "would often take me to see musicals, Disney movies, and we would go karaoke together and perform for each other". She enrolled in her school's choir and eventually starred in a Punahou School production of the musical West Side Story. Sumire was accepted to Carnegie Mellon University in Pittsburgh, Pennsylvania, where she pursued a Bachelor of Fine Arts in musical theater and acting. She later complimented the school's conservatory program but noted that she "did feel some racial discrimination from the people of the town. After being in the school, it was amazing, but something in me was telling me that this place was not the place for me."

Following the death of her grandmother in 2010 and the Tōhoku earthquake and tsunami in 2011, Sumire returned to Hawaii to live with her mother. She later moved back to Tokyo.

Career
Sumire is represented by the Japanese talent agency Sky Corporation (for entertainment activities and advertising). In 2014, Sumire guest starred on Hawaii Five-0 as tour bus robber Keilani Makua in the episode "Kanalu Hope Loa".

In 2017, Sumire made her Hollywood debut in the American Christian drama The Shack where she played the role of Holy Spirit (Sarayu). In 2019, she appeared in the sports movie The Brighton Miracle which depicts Japan's performance at the 2015 Rugby World Cup. Sumire played the role of Satomi Leitch, who is the wife of Michael Leitch and captain of the Japanese rugby team.

In 2021, she became a One Young World Japan Honorary Delegate.

Personal life 
Sumire was baptized as an infant and attended church at an early age. She attended a Catholic elementary school in Hawaii before joining Punahou School.

On November 25, 2021, Sumire announced on her Instagram that she is married to a man two years older on November 12. At the same time, Sumire also announced the pregnancy of her first child. On April 30, 2022, she gave birth to a healthy baby boy.

Filmography

Films

TV series

Variety

Drama

Theatre

Discography

As lead artist

References

External links
  
 
 Official profile at Sky Corporation 
 
 

1990 births
Living people
Actresses from Tokyo
Models from Tokyo Metropolis
Japanese emigrants to the United States
Actresses from Honolulu
Female models from Hawaii
Punahou School alumni
Carnegie Mellon University alumni
Japanese film actresses
Japanese television actresses
Japanese stage actresses
Japanese female models
Japanese women pop singers
Japanese television personalities
Japanese Christians
21st-century Japanese singers
21st-century Japanese women singers
21st-century Japanese actresses